Econ Journal Watch is a semiannual peer-reviewed electronic journal established in 2004. It is published by the Fraser Institute. According its website, the journal publishes comments on articles appearing in other economics journals, essays, reflections, investigations, and classic critiques.  As of 2017, the Journal maintained a podcast, voiced by Lawrence H. White.

As of 2011, the editor-in-chief was Daniel B. Klein; in 2018, the Managing editor was Jason Briggeman.  As of 2022, the Fraser Institute claimed nine Nobel laureates had been on the Journals advisory council.

Abstracting and indexing 
The journal is abstracted and indexed in the Social Sciences Citation Index, Current Contents/Social & Behavioral Sciences, EconLit, Journal of Economic Literature, and Research Papers in Economics. According to the Journal Citation Reports, the journal has a 2010 impact factor of 0.920.

Reception 
Jonathan Chait, writing in The New Republic, credited the 2011 commissioning and publication on Econ Journal Watch of new research which corrected research it had previously published in 2010.  The Mockingbird also credited the editor of the Journal for co-captaining the new research. Matthew Yglesias remarked on the new study.

In popular media, the Journal is cited in news reporting by media such as The Washington Post, Inside Higher Ed, etc.

See also
 List of economics journals

References

External links
 

Publications established in 2004
Economics journals
English-language journals